Pyrgulina fischeri is a species of sea snail, a marine gastropod mollusk in the family Pyramidellidae, the pyrams and their allies.

Distribution
This marine species occurs in the following locations:
 European waters (ERMS scope)
 Mediterranean Sea

References

External links
 To Biodiversity Heritage Library (1 publication)
 To CLEMAM
 To Encyclopedia of Life
 To World Register of Marine Species

Pyramidellidae
Gastropods described in 1925